Clayfield railway station is located on the Pinkenba line in Queensland, Australia. It is one of two railway stations serving the Brisbane suburb of Clayfield, the other being Eagle Junction railway station.

History
Clayfield station opened on 3 September 1882 coinciding with that of the Pinkenba railway line. The line was electrified on 6 February 1988, All passenger services on the line were suspended on 27 September 1993 as part of a statewide rationalisation of the rail network with the closing or suspending of under-utilised or unprofitable rail lines. Only on days of major race events at nearby Eagle Farm and Doomben race tracks did few special services run on the line, and only to adjoining stations of Ascot and Doomben.

Passenger services resumed on 27 January 1998, but only as far as Doomben with bus connections to the other abandoned stations.

Services
Clayfield station is served by all stops Doomben line services from Doomben to Roma Street, Park Road and Cleveland.

Services by platform

References

External links

Clayfield station Queensland Rail
Clayfield station Queensland's Railways on the Internet
[ Clayfield station] TransLink travel information

Clayfield, Queensland
Railway stations in Australia opened in 1882
Railway stations in Brisbane